Préville is a neighbourhood in Saint-Lambert, Quebec and a former city. Excised from part of the Cité de Jacques-Cartier's territory on March 11, 1948, Préville existed as city in its own right until it was absorbed into the city of Saint-Lambert in 1969.

Préville is located in the westernmost part of  Saint-Lambert, to the west of the Country Club of Montreal golf club. Préville was built up primarily in the period following World War II.

History 
Arguing that the physical separation of Preville from Jacques-Cartier was "an anomaly", Preville Ltd and the Country Club of Montreal successfully convinced the provincial government to incorporate the town of Preville. Preville Ltd and the Country Club of Montreal owned the land which they had been subdividing, developing and selling off.

In 1969, Preville was merged into Saint-Lambert, Quebec.

Past mayors

Street names 
Préville's streets are named after provinces of France; the concept originated from Préville itself, at the time when it was a town, and has since been maintained by Saint-Lambert for newer streets built in the neighborhood.

The only streets that are not named after French provinces are the neighborhood's four main streets: Simard, Victoria, Queen and Riverside. Until 1967 the portion of Victoria Avenue extending into Préville was named Devonshire Road. The portion of Riverside Drive located in Préville was named King Edward Boulevard, until 1979.

Education 
École Préville, administered by the Commission Scolaire Marie-Victorin, provides French-language primary education. It is the only primary school in Preville, as of June 2015. Preville School was built in 1958-59 under the aegis of the Chambly County Protestant School Board and operated for many years with classes only in English for grades 1 to 9.

Since July 1, 1998, English-language education has been the responsibility of the Riverside School Board. There is no longer an English-language school in Preville. English primary  students (Kindergarten-Grade 6) attend Saint-Lambert Elementary, on Green Street. High school students (Secondary 1 through 5) attend Chambly Academy (Formerly Chambly County High School), in Saint-Lambert. The South Shore Protestant Regional School Board had previously served the municipality.

References

External links
More info (in French): http://marigot.ca/Atlas/Ind_Pag/Cen_Pag/Haut_Pag/20_Pag/Balk_Bas.htm

Former municipalities in Quebec
Saint-Lambert, Quebec
Populated places disestablished in 1969
Neighbourhoods in Montérégie